Abijah Mann Jr. (September 24, 1793 – September 6, 1868) was an American politician who served two terms as a U.S. Representative from New York from 1833 to 1837.

Early life 
Born in Fairfield, New York, Mann attended the common schools. He engaged in mercantile pursuits.  He was a justice of the peace. He was appointed by President Andrew Jackson as Postmaster of Fairfield and served from May 28, 1830, to January 16, 1833. He was a member of the New York State Assembly in 1828, 1829, 1830 and 1838.

Congress 
Mann was elected as a Jacksonian to the 23rd and 24th United States Congresses, holding office from March 4, 1833, to March 3, 1837.

Later career and death 
He moved to New York City. He was an unsuccessful candidate for Attorney General of New York at the New York state election, 1855. He was a delegate to the Republican state convention in 1856. He was an unsuccessful candidate for the State Senate in 1857.

He died in Auburn, New York, September 6, 1868.

State Senator Charles A. Mann (1803–1860) was his brother; Dr. Matthew Derbyshire Mann (1845–1921) was his nephew.

Sources

1793 births
1868 deaths
Members of the New York State Assembly
New York (state) postmasters
People from Fairfield, New York
Burials at Green-Wood Cemetery
Jacksonian members of the United States House of Representatives from New York (state)
19th-century American politicians
Members of the United States House of Representatives from New York (state)